Victor Arnold (born Arnold Ratner; July 1, 1936 – April 13, 2012) was an American actor. He appeared in more than 40 films from 1956 to 2011. He also played roles on various television shows and soap operas, including The Edge of Night and The Best of Everything.

Select filmography

References

External links 

1936 births
2012 deaths
American male film actors
Male actors from New York (state)